The Tegeta escrow account scandal is a 2014 multi million-dollar corruption scheme in the government of Tanzania. Reports and documents show that between US$250 million and $800 million were transferred from the Bank of Tanzania, the country's central bank, and distributed illegally among government officials.

References

External links
Allafrica.com
Newstimeafrica.com
Pesatimes.com
Voaswahili.com
Mwananchi.co.tz
Thecitizen.co.tz
Theguardian.com
News.yahoo.com
Bbc.com
Reuters.com
News24.com
Dailynews.co.tz
Theguardian.com
Mg.co.za
Parliament.go.tz

2014 in Tanzania
2014 scandals
Financial scandals
Political scandals